The , also called the , re-established peaceful relations between Japan and the Allied Powers on behalf of the United Nations by ending the legal state of war and providing for redress for hostile actions up to and including World War II. It was signed by 49 nations on 8 September 1951, in San Francisco, California, U.S. at the War Memorial Opera House. Italy and China were not invited, the latter due to disagreements on whether the Republic of China or the People's Republic of China represented the Chinese people. Korea was also not invited due to a similar disagreement on whether South Korea or North Korea represented the Korean people.

The treaty came into force on 28 April 1952. It ended Japan's role as an imperial power, allocated compensation to Allied nations and former prisoners of war who had suffered Japanese war crimes during World War II, ended the Allied post-war occupation of Japan, and returned full sovereignty to it. This treaty relied heavily on the United Nations Charter and the Universal Declaration of Human Rights to enunciate the Allies' goals. In Article 11, Japan accepted the judgments of the International Military Tribunal for the Far East and of other Allied War Crimes Courts imposed on Japan both within and outside Japan.

The 1951 treaty, along with the Security Treaty signed that same day, marks the beginning of the San Francisco System which defines Japan's relationship with the United States and its role in the international arena and characterizes Japan's post-war history.

Attendance

Present
Argentina, Australia, Belgium, Bolivia, Brazil, Cambodia, Canada, Ceylon (currently Sri Lanka), Chile, Colombia, Costa Rica, Cuba, Czechoslovakia, the Dominican Republic, Ecuador, Egypt, El Salvador, Ethiopia, France, Greece, Guatemala, Haiti, Honduras, India, Indonesia, Iran, Iraq, Japan, Laos, Lebanon, Liberia, Luxembourg, Mexico, the Netherlands, New Zealand, Nicaragua, Norway, Pakistan, Panama, Paraguay, Peru, the Philippines, Poland, Saudi Arabia, South Africa, South Vietnam, the Soviet Union, Syria, Turkey, the United Kingdom, the United States, Uruguay, and Venezuela attended the Conference.

Absent
China was not invited due to disagreements between the United States and Great Britain on whether the established but defeated Republic of China (in Taiwan) or the newly formed People's Republic of China (in mainland China) represented the Chinese people. The United States recognized the ROC government while Britain had recognized the PRC in 1950. Additionally, an internal US political debate had seen the Republican Party and US military supporting the Kuomintang party and accusing President Truman of having abandoned the anti-communism cause. 

The absence of China at the table would later play a significant  role in the South China Sea dispute, specifically regarding the overall diplomatic relationship (or lack thereof) between the United States and China. "The absence of contact between the United States and China made the establishment of shared norms, or even areas of mutually acknowledged difference, impossible."

Burma, India, and Yugoslavia were invited, but did not participate; India considered certain provisions of the treaty to constitute limitations on Japanese sovereignty and national independence. India signed a separate peace treaty, the Treaty of Peace Between Japan and India, for the purpose of giving Japan a proper position of honor and equality among the community of free nations, on June 9, 1952. Italy was not invited, despite its government having issued a formal declaration of war on Japan on July 14, 1945, just a few weeks before the end of the war. Nor was Portugal invited, even though, despite its status as a neutral country during the war, its territory of East Timor had been invaded by Japan . Pakistan, although it had not existed as a state at the time of the war, was invited because it was seen as a successor state to British India, a major combatant against Japan.

Stances

Soviet Union's opposition to the treaty
The Soviet Union took part in the San Francisco conference, and the Soviet delegation was led by the Soviet Deputy Foreign Minister Andrei Gromyko. From the start of the conference the Soviet Union expressed vigorous and vocal opposition to the draft treaty text prepared by the United States and the United Kingdom. The Soviet delegation made several unsuccessful procedural attempts to stall the proceedings. The Soviet Union's objections were detailed in a lengthy 8 September 1951, statement by Gromyko. The statement contained a number of the Soviet Union's claims and assertions: that the treaty did not provide any guarantees against the rise of Japanese militarism; that China was not invited to participate despite being one of the main victims of the Japanese aggression; that the Soviet Union was not properly consulted when the treaty was being prepared; that the treaty sets up Japan as an American military base and draws Japan into a military coalition directed against the Soviet Union; that the treaty was in effect a separate peace treaty; that the draft treaty violated the rights of China to Taiwan and several other islands; that the draft treaty, in violation of the Yalta agreement, did not recognize the Soviet Union's sovereignty over South Sakhalin and the Kuril Islands; and other objections. It was not until 19 October 1956, that Japan and the Soviet Union signed a Joint Declaration ending the war and reestablishing diplomatic relations.

People's Republic of China's objections to the treaty
The ongoing Chinese Civil War and thus the question of which Chinese government was legitimate presented a dilemma to conference organizers. The United States wanted to invite the Republic of China (ROC) on Taiwan to represent China, while the United Kingdom wished to invite the People's Republic of China (PRC) on mainland China as China's representative. As a compromise, neither government was invited.

Sri Lanka's defence of Japan
A major player in providing support for a post-war free Japan was the delegation from Ceylon (now known as Sri Lanka). While many were reluctant to allow a free Japan capable of aggressive action and insisted that the terms of surrender should be rigidly enforced in an attempt to break the spirit of the Japanese nation, the Ceylonese Finance Minister J.R. Jayawardene spoke in defence of a free Japan and informed the conference of Ceylon's refusal to accept the payment of reparations that would harm Japan's economy. His reason was "We in Ceylon were fortunate that we were not invaded, but the damage caused by air raids, by the stationing of enormous armies under the South-East Asia Command, and by the slaughter-tapping of one of our main commodities, rubber, when we were the only producer of natural rubber for the Allies, entitles us to ask that the damage so caused should be repaired. We do not intend to do so for we believe in the words of the Great Teacher [Buddha] whose message has ennobled the lives of countless millions in Asia, that 'hatred ceases not by hatred but by love'." He ended the same speech by saying:This treaty is as magnanimous as it is just to a defeated foe. We extend to Japan the hand of friendship and trust that with the closing of this chapter in the history of man, the last page of which we write today, and with the beginning of the new one, the first page of which we dictate tomorrow, her people and ours may march together to enjoy the full dignity of human life in peace and prosperity.

Minister Jayewardene's speech was received with resounding applause. Afterwards, the New York Times stated, "The voice of free Asia, eloquent, melancholy and still strong with the lilt of an Oxford accent, dominated the Japanese peace treaty conference today."

Signatories and ratification
Of the 51 participating countries, 48 signed the treaty; Czechoslovakia, Poland and the Soviet Union refused.

The signatories to the treaty were: Argentina, Australia, Belgium, Bolivia, Brazil, Cambodia, Canada, Ceylon (currently Sri Lanka), Chile, Colombia, Costa Rica, Cuba, the Dominican Republic, Ecuador, Egypt, El Salvador, Ethiopia, France, Greece, Guatemala, Haiti, Honduras, Indonesia, Iran, Iraq, Laos, Lebanon, Liberia, Luxembourg, Mexico, the Netherlands, New Zealand, Nicaragua, Norway, Pakistan, Panama, Paraguay, Peru, the Philippines, Saudi Arabia, South Africa, South Vietnam, Syria, Turkey, the United Kingdom, the United States, Uruguay, Venezuela and Japan.

The Philippines ratified the San Francisco Treaty on July 16, 1956, after the signing of a reparations agreement between both countries in May of that year. Indonesia did not ratify the San Francisco Peace Treaty. Instead, it signed with Japan a bilateral reparations agreement and peace treaty on January 20, 1958. A separate treaty, the Treaty of Taipei, formally known as the Sino-Japanese Peace Treaty, was signed in Taipei on April 28, 1952, between Japan and the ROC, just hours before the Treaty of San Francisco also went into effect on April 28. The apparent illogical order of the two treaties is due to the difference between time zones.

Fate of Taiwan and other Japanese overseas territories

According to the treaty's travaux préparatoires, a consensus existed among the states present at the San Francisco Peace Conference that, while the legal status of the island of Taiwan is temporarily undetermined, it would be resolved at a later time in accordance with the principles of peaceful settlement of disputes and self-determination, ideas that had been enshrined in the UN Charter.

The document officially renounces Japan's treaty rights derived from the Boxer Protocol of 1901 and its rights to Korea, Formosa (Taiwan) and the Pescadores, Hong Kong (then a British colony), the Kuril Islands, the Spratly Islands, Antarctica and South Sakhalin.

Article 3 of the treaty left the Bonin Islands, Volcano Islands (including Iwo Jima), and the Ryukyu Islands, which included Okinawa and the Amami, Miyako and Yaeyama Islands groups, under a potential U.N. trusteeship. While the treaty provision implied that these territories would become a United Nations trusteeship, in the end that option was not pursued. The Amami Islands were eventually restored to Japan on 25 December 1953, with the Bonin and Volcano Islands restored on 5 April 1968. In 1969 U.S.-Japan negotiations authorized the transfer of authority over the Ryūkyūs to Japan to be implemented in 1972. In 1972, the United States' "reversion" of the Ryūkyūs occurred along with the ceding of control over the nearby Senkaku Islands. Both the People's Republic of China (PRC) and the Republic of China (ROC) argue that this agreement did not determine the ultimate sovereignty of the Senkaku Islands.

The Treaty of Taipei between Japan and the ROC stated that all residents of Taiwan and the Pescadores were deemed as nationals of the ROC.  Additionally, in Article 2 it specified that -- 
It is recognised that under Article 2 of the Treaty of Peace which Japan signed at the city of San Francisco on 8 September 1951 (hereinafter referred to as the San Francisco Treaty), Japan has renounced all right, title, and claim to Taiwan (Formosa) and Penghu (the Pescadores) as well as the Spratley Islands and the Paracel Islands. However, this treaty does not include any wording saying that Japan recognizes that the territorial sovereignty of Taiwan was transferred to the Republic of China.

Some supporters of Taiwan independence refer to the San Francisco Peace Treaty to argue that Taiwan is not a part of the Republic of China, for it does not explicitly state the sovereignty status of Taiwan after Japan's renunciation. In 1955, U.S. Secretary of State John Foster Dulles, co-author of the San Francisco Peace Treaty, affirmed that the treaty ceded Taiwan to no one; that Japan "merely renounced sovereignty over Taiwan". Dulles said that America "cannot, therefore, admit that the disposition of Taiwan is merely an internal problem of China." However, the ROC Ministry of Foreign Affairs rejected this justification, arguing that the Instrument of Surrender of Japan accepts the Potsdam Declaration and the Cairo Declaration, which intends Taiwan and Penghu to be restored to the ROC. Supporters of Taiwan independence point out that the Potsdam Declaration and the Cairo Declaration were not treaties, but President Ma expressed that the Treaty of Taipei has voided the Treaty of Shimonoseki and recognizes that people of Taiwan and Penghu as Chinese nationality. In more recent years supporters of Taiwan independence have more often relied on arguments based on self-determination as implied in the San Francisco Peace Treaty and popular sovereignty, but the United Nations has consistently rejected such arguments.

By Article 11 Japan accepted the judgments of the International Military Tribunal for the Far East and of other Allied War Crimes Courts both within and outside Japan and agreed to carry out the sentences imposed thereby upon Japanese nationals imprisoned in Japan.

The document further set guidelines for repatriation of Allied prisoners of war and renounces future military aggression under the guidelines set by the United Nations Charter. The document nullifies prior treaties and lays down the framework for Japan's current status of retaining a military that is purely defensive in nature.

There is also some ambiguity as to over which islands Japan has renounced sovereignty. This has led to both the Kuril Islands dispute and the Senkaku Islands dispute.

Compensation to Allied countries and POWs

Transfer of Japanese overseas assets

In accordance with Article 14 of the Treaty, Allied forces confiscated all assets owned by the Japanese government, firms, organization and private citizens, in all colonized or occupied countries except China, which was dealt with under Article 21. China repossessed all Japanese assets in Manchuria and Inner Mongolia, which included mineworks and railway infrastructure. Moreover, Article 4 of the treaty stated that "the disposition of property of Japan and of its nationals...and their claims...against the authorities presently administering such areas and the residents...shall be the subject of special arrangements between Japan and such authorities." Although Korea was not a signatory state of the treaty, it was also entitled to the benefits of Article 4 by the provisions of Article 21.

Total amount of Japanese overseas assets in China was US$18,758,600,000 in 1945 USD.

Compensation to Allied POWs
Article 16 of the San Francisco Treaty states:As an expression of its desire to indemnify those members of the armed forces of the Allied Powers who suffered undue hardships while prisoners of war of Japan, Japan will transfer its assets and those of its nationals in countries which were neutral during the war, or which were at war with any of the Allied Powers, or, at its option, the equivalent of such assets, to the International Committee of the Red Cross which shall liquidate such assets and distribute the resultant fund to appropriate national agencies, for the benefit of former prisoners of war and their families on such basis as it may determine to be equitable. The categories of assets described in Article 14(a)2(II)(ii) through (v) of the present Treaty shall be excepted from transfer, as well as assets of Japanese natural persons not residents of Japan on the first coming into force of the Treaty. It is equally understood that the transfer provision of this Article has no application to the 19,770 shares in the Bank for International Settlements presently owned by Japanese financial institutions.

Accordingly, Japan paid £4,500,000 to the Red Cross.

Article 16 has served as a bar against subsequent lawsuits filed by former Allied prisoners of war against Japan. In 1998, a Tokyo court ruled against a suit brought by former Allied POWs, citing the San Francisco Treaty.

Allied territories occupied by Japan

Article 14 of the treaty stated thatIt is recognized that Japan should pay reparations to the Allied Powers for the damage and suffering caused by it during the war. Nevertheless it is also recognized that the resources of Japan are not presently sufficient, if it is to maintain a viable economy, to make complete reparation for all such damage and suffering and at the same time meet its other obligations. Therefore,Japan will promptly enter into negotiations with Allied Powers so desiring, whose present territories were occupied by Japanese forces and damaged by Japan, with a view to assisting to compensate those countries for the cost of repairing the damage done, by making available the services of the Japanese people in production, salvaging and other work for the Allied Powers in question.

Accordingly, the Philippines and South Vietnam received compensation in 1956 and 1959, respectively. Burma and Indonesia were not original signatories, but they later signed bilateral treaties in accordance with Article 14 of the San Francisco Treaty.

Japanese military yen issued by force in Hong Kong, Papua New Guinea, the Philippines, Taiwan, and other places for the economic advantage of Japan were not honoured by them after the war. This caused much suffering, but the claims of the Hong Kong Reparation Association in 1993, in a Tokyo district court, failed in 1999. The court acknowledged the suffering of the Hong Kong people, but reasoned that the Government of Japan did not have specific laws concerning military yen compensation and that the United Kingdom was a signatory to the Treaty of San Francisco.

Regarding China, on September 29, 1972, the Government of the People's Republic of China declared "that in the interest of the friendship between the Chinese and the Japanese peoples, it renounces its demand for war reparation from Japan" in article 5 of the Joint Communique of the Government of Japan and the Government of the People's Republic of China.

The last payment was made to the Philippines on July 22, 1976.

Unresolved issues
Certain ambiguous wording in the treaty about the political status of Taiwan (i.e. whether the territory of Taiwan was legally retroceded to the Republic of China in 1945) after Japan renounced all right, title, and claim concerning the island of Taiwan, the Pescadores, the Spratly Islands, and the Paracel Islands in 1952 (with the ratification of this treaty in the ROC) has given rise to the Theory of the Undetermined Status of Taiwan, which is one of the major theories within this debate. This particular theory is generally Taiwan independence-leaning since it offers evidence supporting the notion that Chinese sovereignty over Taiwan (whether ROC or PRC) is either illegitimate or temporary and must be resolved via the postcolonial principle of self-determination. Proponents of this theory generally do not claim that Japan still has or should have sovereignty over Taiwan, though there are exceptions.

Because Korea did not sign the treaty, it was not entitled to the benefits provided to by Article 14, so Koreans directly affected by Japanese atrocities were not compensated upon the ratification. When relations between the two countries were normalised in the 1965 Treaty on Basic Relations, Japan agreed to pay settlements, including all claims under Article 4 of the Treaty of San Francisco, directly to the Korean government. The Korean government would then compensate individual victims on a case-by-case basis; however, the government at the time used the funds to develop Korea's economy, and passed few reparations to individuals. Amid recent rising tensions, many victims of Japanese crimes maintain that Japan has not been held sufficiently to account, and have demanded reparations for those who have not been compensated. South Korea claims that the 1965 treaty was not intended to settle individual claims for Japanese war crimes and crimes against humanity; Japan claims that under the 1965 treaty, it is no longer legally responsible for compensating all victims.

See also
1971 Okinawa Reversion Agreement
Cairo Declaration (1943)
General Order No. 1 (Aug. 1945)
Japanese holdout
Japanese Instrument of Surrender (Sep. 1945)
Political status of Taiwan
Potsdam Declaration (July 1945)
Security Treaty Between the United States and Japan (1952)
Treaty of Mutual Cooperation and Security between the United States and Japan (1960)
Treaty of Peace Between Japan and India (1952)
Treaty of Taipei (1952)

Germany:
General Treaty, 1952 treaty with the U.S., U.K., and France, ending West Germany's status as an occupied territory, effective in 1955
Paris Peace Treaties, 1947, similar treaties dealing with other countries in the European theatre
Potsdam Agreement, a 1945 communique by the Allies detailing post-war relations with Germany (not to be confused with the Potsdam Declaration)
Treaty on the Final Settlement with Respect to Germany, a 1990 treaty with Germany that marked the final settlement between the Allied Powers and Germany, decades after the end of WWII

References

Further reading
 Calder, Kent. "Securing security through prosperity: the San Francisco System in comparative perspective." The Pacific Review 17.1 (2004): 135–157. online
 Hara, Kimie. "50 years from San Francisco: Re-examining the peace treaty and Japan's territorial problems." Pacific Affairs (2001): 361–382. online
 Lee, Seokwoo. "The 1951 San Francisco peace treaty with Japan and the territorial disputes in East Asia." Pacific Rim Law and Policy Journal 11 (2002): 63+ online.
 Trefalt, Beatrice. "A peace worth having: delayed repatriations and domestic debate over the San Francisco Peace Treaty." Japanese Studies 27.2 (2007): 173–187.
 Zhang, Shengfa. "The Soviet-Sino boycott of the American-led peace settlement with Japan in the early 1950s." Russian History 29.2/4 (2002): 401–414.

External links

Treaty of Peace with Japan Signed at San Francisco on 8 September 1951
Agreement for the Settlement of Disputes arising under Article 15(a) of the Treaty of Peace with Japan
Prime Minister Shigeru Yoshida's Speech at the San Francisco Peace Conference
John Foster Dulles's Speech at the San Francisco Peace Conference
Understanding the San Francisco Peace Treaty's Disposition of Formosa and the Pescadores
Joint Communique of the Government of Japan and the Government of the People's Republic of China 1972
Chihiro Hosoya, "The Road to San Francisco: The Shaping of American Policy on the Japanese Peace Treaty" The Japanese Journal of American Studies 1(1981) pp. 87-117

Cold War treaties
Cold War history of Japan
Foreign relations of Post-war Japan
Peace treaties of the United States
Peace treaties of Japan
Peace treaties of Norway
Treaty
1951 in Japan
September 1951 events in the United States
April 1952 events in the United States
Aftermath of World War II in Japan
World War II treaties
Japan–United States relations
Japan–Soviet Union relations
Treaties concluded in 1951
Treaties entered into force in 1952
History of San Francisco
Treaties of Argentina
Treaties of Australia
Treaties of Belgium
Treaties of Bolivia
Treaties of the Second Brazilian Republic
Treaties of the French protectorate of Cambodia
Treaties of Canada
Treaties of the Dominion of Ceylon
Treaties of Chile
Treaties of Colombia
Treaties of Costa Rica
Treaties of Cuba
Treaties of the Dominican Republic
Treaties of Ecuador
Treaties of the Kingdom of Egypt
Treaties of El Salvador
Treaties of the Ethiopian Empire
Treaties of the French Fourth Republic
Treaties of the Kingdom of Greece
Treaties of Guatemala
Treaties of Haiti
Treaties of Honduras
Treaties of Indonesia
Treaties of Pahlavi Iran
Treaties of the Kingdom of Iraq
Treaties of the Kingdom of Laos
Treaties of Lebanon
Treaties of Liberia
Treaties of Luxembourg
Treaties of Mexico
Peace treaties of the Netherlands
Treaties of New Zealand
Treaties of Nicaragua
Peace treaties of Pakistan
Treaties of Paraguay
Treaties of Panama
Treaties of Peru
Treaties of the Philippines
Treaties of Saudi Arabia
Treaties of South Vietnam
Treaties of the Union of South Africa
Treaties of the Syrian Republic (1930–1963)
Treaties of Turkey
Peace treaties of the United Kingdom
Treaties of Uruguay
Treaties of Venezuela
1951 in California
1950s in San Francisco
1951 in Japanese politics